Bush Island is a small, remote island in the Qikiqtaaluk Region of Nunavut, Canada.

Perrett Island, Hettash Island, and Flat Island, lie off the west end of Bush Island, separated by Lenz Strait.

References

Islands of Hudson Strait
Uninhabited islands of Qikiqtaaluk Region